Brandy: Special Delivery is an American reality series following R&B singer Brandy's pregnancy with baby Sy'rai. The series aired on MTV. The premiere episode premiered in the United States and Germany on June 18, 2002, with Canada following on June 21, where it took The Osbournes TV slot on Tuesdays 10:30 pm. The show eventually spawned four episodes.

Production history
Originally only planned to be a regular Diary episode, MTV felt the material was interesting and entertaining enough to sustain a five-episode-series.

Before the series even aired, it drew comparisons to The Osbournes which Special Delivery would replace. MTV denied any similarities stating, "The show really has nothing to do with The Osbournes".

Episodes

Cast

Main cast 
 Brandy – R&B singer and actress
 Robert "Big Bert" Smith – Brandy's boyfriend and producer
 Sonja Norwood – Brandy's mother and manager
 Ray J – Brandy's brother (episodes 2 & 4)
 Willie Norwood – Brandy's father (episodes 2 & 4)

Secondary cast 
 Sy'rai Iman Smith – Brandy's daughter (episode 4)
 Drano – a manager and the baby's godfather (episodes 1 & 3)
 Dick Clark – TV-host (episode 1)
 Wanda Dennis – parent mentor (episodes 1 & 2)
 Jackie Maser – Brandy's interior decorator (episodes 1 & 3)
 Mike City – producer of the song "Full Moon" (episode 3)
 Dr. Felicia Ota – Brandy's doctor (episode 3 & 4)
 Darien Davis – Brandy's photographer (episode 3)
 Grace Holmes – Brandy and Robert's midwife (episodes 3 & 4)

Music
During the show the viewers get to hear several of Brandy's songs from her current and her previous albums. The following lists every song played during the show. (in the order of being played)

Episode 1
 "Happy" (theme song)
 "Top of the World" (featuring Ma$e)
 "One Voice"
 "He Is" (being recorded)
 "Come a Little Bit Closer"
 "U Don't Know Me (Like U Used To)"
 "Sunny Day"
 "Love Wouldn't Count Me Out"

Episode 2
 "Happy" (theme song)
 "What About Us?"
 "Top of the World" (featuring Ma$e)
 "U Don't Know Me (Like U Used To)"
 "Best Friend"
 "Full Moon"
 "Give Me You"
 "Baby"
 "Almost Doesn't Count"
 "I Wanna Be Down
 "Always on My Mind"
 "B-Rock Intro"
 "Come a Little Bit Closer"

Episode 3
 "Happy" (theme song)
 "Top of the World" (featuring Ma$e)
 "U Don't Know Me (Like U Used To)" (Remix featuring Shaunta & Da Brat)
 "Tomorrow"

Episode 4
 "Who's That Girl?" (by Eve)
 "The Boy Is Mine"
 "Low Rider"
 "He Is"
 "U Don't Know Me (Like U Used To)"
 "Rock the Boat" (by Aaliyah)
 "What It Is" (by Busta Rhymes featuring Kelis)

References

External links
 

2002 American television series debuts
2002 American television series endings
2000s American reality television series
English-language television shows
MTV reality television series
African-American reality television series